California Games is a 1987 sports video game originally released by Epyx for the Apple II and Commodore 64, and ported to other home computers and video game consoles. Branching from their Summer Games and Winter Games series, this game consists of a collection of outdoor sports purportedly popular in California. The game was successful and spawned a sequel.

Gameplay
The events available vary slightly depending on the platform, but include all of the following: 
Half-pipe
Footbag
Surfing (Starring Rippin' Rick)
Roller skating
BMX
Flying disc

Development
Several members of the development team moved on to other projects. Chuck Sommerville, the designer of the half-pipe game in California Games, later developed the game Chip's Challenge, while Ken Nicholson, the designer of the footbag game, was the inventor of the technology used in Microsoft's DirectX. Kevin Norman, the designer of the BMX game, went on to found the educational science software company Norman & Globus, makers of the ElectroWiz series of products.

The sound design for the original version of California Games was done by Chris Grigg, member of the band Negativland.

Ports
Originally written for the Apple II and Commodore 64, it was eventually ported to Amiga, Apple IIGS, Atari 2600, Atari ST, MS-DOS, Genesis, Amstrad CPC, ZX Spectrum, Nintendo Entertainment System, MSX and Master System. The Atari Lynx version was the pack-in game for the system when it was launched in June 1989. An Atari XE version was planned and contracted out by Atari Corp. to Epyx in 1988 but no code was delivered by the publication deadline.

Reception

California Games was a commercial blockbuster. With more than 300,000 copies sold in the first nine months, it was the most-successful Epyx game, outselling each of the four previous and two subsequent titles in the company's "Games" series. CEO David Shannon Morse stated that it was the first Epyx game to appeal equally to boys and girls during playtesting. The game topped 500,000 units sold by 1989, at which time Video Games & Computer Entertainment reported that sales were "still mounting".

Computer Gaming World recommended the game, calling it fun. Compute! called California Games "both inventive and charming". In a capsule review for STart, Clayton Walnum said California Games "isn't a bad package, especially since it comes free with the Lynx." He found the BMX and surfing events great fun but deemed the skateboarding event frustrating and said the foot-bag event is pleasant but quickly wears thin.

In 1996, Next Generation listed the "Games" series collectively as number 89 on its "Top 100 Games of All Time". The magazine stated that though the games had great graphics for their time, their most defining qualities were their competitive multiplayer modes and "level of control that has yet to be equaled". In 2004, the Atari Lynx version of California Games was inducted into GameSpot's list of the greatest games of all time.

Legacy
The game was followed in 1990 by California Games II, but the sequel failed to match the original's success.

A California Games television series was considered in the late 1980s as part of the Super Mario Bros. Power Hour, a one-hour animation block of Nintendo focused video game adaptations. Concept art was produced for the project by DIC Animation City. Only the Mario and Zelda segments for the block were ultimately produced, airing in 1989 as part of The Super Mario Bros. Super Show!.

The game was released for mobile phones in the Java format, and current rights holders System 3 CEO Mark Cale has stated that the game will be available in future as both a retail product and an online product for the PlayStation 3, Wii and Nintendo DS. The Commodore 64 version was released for the Wii's Virtual Console service in Europe on April 11, 2008, and in North America on July 6, 2009.

References

External links
California Games package and manual scans at c64sets.com

California Games for the Amiga at the Hall of Light (HOL)
California Games for the Atari 2600 at Atari Mania
California Games for the Atari ST at Atari Mania
California Games for the Lynx at Atari Age

1987 video games
Amiga games
Amstrad CPC games
Appaloosa Interactive games
Apple II games
Apple IIGS games
Atari 2600 games
Atari Lynx games
Atari ST games
Commodore 64 games
Cycling video games
DOS games
Epyx games
Master System games
Mobile games
MSX games
Multiplayer and single-player video games
Multiple-sport video games
Nintendo Entertainment System games
Pack-in video games
Sega Genesis games
Skateboarding video games
Surfing video games
U.S. Gold games
Video games developed in the United States
Video games scored by Alex Rudis
Video games scored by David Wise
Video games set in California
Video games with oblique graphics
Water sports video games
Westwood Studios games
ZX Spectrum games
Virtual Console games for Wii